Honoré Zanchi (born May 4, 1962), known as The Avenger (French: Le Nettoyeur), is a French criminal and serial killer who killed four people from 1992 to 2009, who had harmed his friends. He was sentenced to 30 years imprisonment for the latter three murders.

Biography

Youth 
Honoré Zanchi was born on May 4, 1962 in Aiguèze, the third of four children. For the first years of his life, Zanchi lived what he later described as a happy life in his hometown, until 1969, when they moved to Annonay. Soon after, he began committing petty thefts and moved on to shoplifting during the 1970s. In 1977, aged 15, Zanchi left school to devote himself to manual labour.

First crimes 
In 1978, Zanchi found a job as a bricklayer, but continued doing burglaries to meet his financial needs. One of these occurred at a cinema in Annonay, for which he was arrested and sent to prison. After spending almost a year in prison, he was released from the remand center with a six-month suspended sentence.

During the 1980s, Zanchi befriended a young biker and Harley-Davidson enthusiast named Jean-François "La Pie" André, whom got him interested in the subculture. The two young men became close and admired each other as brothers, putting their friendship above everything else. This did not deter Zanchi from petty crimes, however, and he would be arrested on several more occasions for burglaries.

In 1985, André opened a bar in Drôme, which became popular among fellow bikers. Zanchi was among them, and despite being a repeat criminal, the two men remained close. At one point, local authorities suspected that the pair might have been involved in drug trafficking, but André was never arrested. In 1990, Zanchi had a boy, Angelino, with his girlfriend, whom he had met in the late 1980s.

Murders

First murder 
In February 1992, Zanchi learned that one of his best friends had been assaulted and beaten by another man he had met regularly. Disgusted by this news, he bought two unlicensed 9mm pistols and set out to locate the man and "correct his behavior". Zanchi considered this gesture as a "code of honor towards his friends", in order to "avenge" them if someone attacked them.

On the early morning of February 23, Zanchi tracked down the assailant to a bar-restaurant in Saint-Rambert-d'Albon, which he frequented. Upon seeing the man, Zanchi pulled out one of his pistols and shot him several times, killing him. He then went to the police station, and immediately confessed to the crime. Placed in police custody, Zanchi claimed that he had done it to "avenge" his friend, who had been beaten up by the victim, and that he was a man did not appreciate others picking on his friends. He was then charged with murder and carrying an unlicensed firearm, and in 1993, he was given a 2-year prison term for the latter charge, as he was a convicted felon and was prohibited from carrying firearms.

In 1996, Zanchi was put on trial before the cour d'assises in Gard for the murder. His relatives, friends and even the man he had done the murder for all testified positively on his behalf and expressed strong support for him. Zanchi himself, in a show of solidarity, readily admitted to committing the murder, but claimed he had acted in self-defense on behalf of his friend. At the end, he was found guilty of manslaughter and sentenced to 10 years imprisonment.

Release and relapse 
In January 2000, Zanchi was paroled after serving 8 years of his sentence, immediately returning to his girlfriend and to André's bar, where he was greeted as a hero. On November 2, his girlfriend gave birth to twins, Gino and Enzo, prompting him to abandon his life of crime and to focus on his family. However, he was arrested in 2002 for another burglary, spending a few months in detention before being released in January 2003.

Turning point 
In August 2003, after being free for seven months, Zanchi learned that his best friend André had been murdered near his home, aged 42. Upon hearing this, Zanchi was devastated, developing a feeling of guilt over being unable to protect him. He later attended the funeral, along with thousands of others from different countries.

In December, several people related to André were detained for questioning, but due to lack of evidence, nobody was indicted. Zanchi was questioned and later cleared of suspicion, but two other men, Michel Di Bacco and Gérald Crouzet, raised suspicion among investigators. However, both were also released from custody for the aforementioned reason.

In May 2004, Zanchi was again arrested for carrying a firearm following another burglary. He was returned to prison for 16 months, and immediately after his release, was arrested yet again and given a 30-month sentence. After his release in 2006, Zanchi also begins to suspect that Di Bacco and Crouzet had killed André, and in order to "avenge" his best friend, he planned to steal some guns and kill them. He then robbed a gun store, but was captured and returned to prison before he could use them. During his imprisonment, Zanchi reinforced his desire to kill the men he thought had murdered André.

In 2007, Zanchi was tried before the Criminal Court for the burglary and possession of firearms, and was sentenced to 30 months imprisonment. In the meantime, the investigation into André's murder continued, but it eventually resulted in a dismissal in early 2008.

Release and serial murders 
On April 28, 2008, Zanchi was released from prison. Still hellbent on avenging his best friend, he bought two unlicensed 9mm pistols and started stalking his future victims in an attempt to figure out the best way to kill them without being caught.

On the afternoon of May 13, Zanchi ran into Crouzet, who was driving his Mercedes near Gervans. After forcing the car into a ditch, Zanchi climbed inside, apprehended Crouzet and fired a single bullet into his skull. Seriously injured, Crouzet died a few minutes later, while Zanchi fled in his car. The man's lifeless body was discovered that same day, but after an investigation and an autopsy, his death was erroneously classified as a heart attack. Since homicide was ruled out for now, Crouzet was buried in the local cemetery, without any further inquiries into his death.

In June, Zanchi confides to friends of André that he had killed Crouzet in order to "avenge" his best friend. The bikers were not reassured by his confessions, but nevertheless did not denounce him due to their solidarity. Unlike his first murder, Zanchi did not surrender himself to the police, as he still planned to hunt down Di Bacco. In the early hours of July 29, he parked his moped in front of Di Bacco's bar-restaurant in Arras-sur-Rhône, where he sat waiting for him to appear. Upon seeing Di Bacco, Zanchi shot him 13 times, killing him and then fleeing the scene. Soon after the murder, an investigation was launched to solve the crime, which resulted in the victim's acquaintances being questioned.

In August, several of Di Bacco's relatives told the investigators that he had had a hostile interaction with Jean-François André five years earlier, suggesting that his death could somehow be related. One of the testimonies also mentioned Zanchi as the potential culprit due to his past, but at this time, there was not enough evidence to incriminate him. Another testimony established a new connection to Crouzet's death, which had occurred three months prior. In September, the latter's body was exhumed and it was established that he had been shot to death. At this time, authorities began suspecting that Zanchi might indeed be the killer, wiretapping his car for several months in an effort to gather incriminating evidence, but this proved unsuccessful.

On March 25, 2009, Zanchi was walking around in Arras-sur-Rhône when he crossed paths with 35-year-old mechanic Marc Népote-Cit, who was Di Bacco's best friend. The meeting arose tension between the two, eventually resulting in Zanchi drawing his pistol and shooting Népote-Cit, who succumbed to his injuries. He then loaded the dead man's body in to his car and dumped it near the Roche Péréandre, the place where Zanchi believed André had been killed, and promptly left. The following month, after implicating himself in this murder, Zanchi became the prime suspect in the investigation, who nonetheless interviewed other acquaintances in order to clarify some inconsistencies in their testimonies.

Arrest and investigation 
On April 27, 2009, Zanchi was arrested at a friend's house in Annonay. After being placed in custody, he fiercely denied committing the three murders, but openly bragged about being a good shot with his pistol, as well as being the "best robber in the region" and a "great avenger". The day after his arrest, 21 others were also arrested, but soon released due to lack of evidence. This event put pressure on Zanchi, who began alluding that he was somehow involved in the three murders. Three days later, he was indicted for the murders of Crouzet, Di Bacco and Népote-Cit, as well as carrying an unlicensed firearm, before being remanded in custody to await trial.

While he was now branded a serial killer, the family of Jean-François André still defended him, claiming that he had been heavily affected by the death of the man he considered to be his "foster brother". Following his arrest, the press gave Zanchi various nicknames, including "The Cleaner" (referring to him covering up his tracks after the murders), "The Helmeted Avenger" and "The White Knight".

Trials and sentences 
On November 19, 2010, Zanchi was brought before the criminal court of Privas, where he was convicted for carrying an unlicensed firearm and sentenced to 30 months imprisonment. He was then returned to prison to await trial for the murders, for which he would be represented by attorney Jean-Yves Bret.

On September 18, 2012, his trial began before the cour d'assises in Drôme. While Zanchi remained silent and refused to explain his motives, he was throughout supported by his girlfriend, as well as the immediate family members of André. According to the jurors, he was a vigilante with a very high risk of possible recidivism, taking an "obsession with crime" and turning into a force to kill rivals in order to "avenge" his allies. Three days later, he was convicted of two murders and one count of manslaughter in the Népote-Cit case, for which he was sentenced to life imprisonment.

Zanchi appealed the decision, with his appeal trial scheduled for March 25, 2014, before the cour d'assises in Isère. Attorney Sylvain Cormier was appointed as his new lawyer, and at trial, he argued that his client was actually innocent, claiming that if he was the killer, he would not have waited years before killing the victims. The court, on the other hand, claimed that it was the dismissal of the investigation into André's death a few weeks after Zanchi's release that had prompted him into beginning his killing spree.

On March 28, Zanchi was again found guilty in all three murders, but the court, finding mitigating circumstances, commuted his sentence to 30 years imprisonment. Zanchi and his lawyer filed another appeal, but it was dismissed the following year.

See also 
 List of French serial killers

References

Documentaries 
"Revenge in the land of bikers", broadcast on June 5, 2016 on Bring in the Accused, presented by Frédérique Lantieri on France 2.

1962 births
20th-century French criminals
21st-century French criminals
Burglars
French male criminals
French people convicted of manslaughter
French people convicted of murder
French prisoners and detainees
French prisoners sentenced to life imprisonment
French serial killers
Living people
Male serial killers
People convicted of murder by France
People from Gard
Prisoners and detainees of France
Prisoners sentenced to life imprisonment by France
Vigilantes